In baseball, a pitcher can commit a number of illegal motions or actions that constitute a balk. Most of these violations involve pitchers pretending to pitch when they have no intention of doing so. In games played under the Official Baseball Rules that govern professional play in the United States and Canada, a balk results in a dead ball or delayed dead ball. In certain other circumstances, a balk may be wholly or partially disregarded.  Under other rule sets, notably in the United States under the National Federation of State High School Associations (NFHS Baseball Rules), a balk results in an immediate dead ball. In the event a balk is enforced, the pitch is generally (but not always) nullified, each runner is awarded one base, and the batter (generally) remains at bat, and with the previous count. The balk rule in Major League Baseball was introduced in 1898.

The reason a balk is prohibited is given in the Official Baseball Rules: "Umpires should bear in mind that the purpose of the balk rule is to prevent the pitcher from deliberately deceiving the base runner."

Balk actions
A pitcher is restricted to a certain set of motions and one of two basic pitching positions before and during a pitch. If these regulations are violated with one or more runners on base, an umpire may call a balk. The batter at home plate does not advance on a balk.

With a runner on base and the pitcher on or astride (with one leg on each side of) the rubber, under Official Baseball Rules, it is a balk when the pitcher:
 Switches pitching position from the windup to the set (or vice versa) without properly disengaging the rubber
 While on the rubber, makes a motion associated with a pitch and does not complete the delivery
 When pitching from the set position, fails to make a complete stop with the one's hands together before beginning to pitch
 Throws from the mound to a base without stepping toward (gaining distance in the direction of that base)
 Throws or feints a throw from the rubber to an unoccupied base, unless a play is imminent
 Steps or feints from the rubber to first or third base without completing the throw
 Delivers a quick return, a pitch thrown right after receiving the ball back, with intent to catch the batter off-guard
 Drops the ball while on the rubber, even if by accident, if the ball does not subsequently cross a foul line
 Unnecessarily delays the game 
 Pitches while facing away from the batter
 After bringing one's hands together on the rubber, separates them except in making a pitch or a throw
 Stands on or astride the rubber without the ball, or mimics a pitch without the ball
 Attempts to throw to a fielder in a spot not directly at a base
 Delivers a pitch during a squeeze play or a steal of home, if the catcher or some other player steps on or in front of home plate without possession of the ball, or touches the batter (or the bat). The ball is dead, the batter is awarded first base, the pitcher is charged with a balk, and the run scores
With the addition of new pace-of-play rules introduced for the 2023 season, a pitcher is charged with a balk if he attempts a pickoff more than twice in a single at-bat without recording an out, and without the runner advancing.

Under NFHS Rules, a balk occurs when

 There is any feinting toward the batter or first base, or any dropping of the ball (even though accidental) and the ball does not cross a foul line.
 The pitcher fails to step with the non-pivot foot directly toward a base (occupied or unoccupied) when throwing or feinting there in an attempt to put out, or drive back a runner; or throwing or feinting to any unoccupied base when it is not an attempt to put out or drive back a runner.
 An illegal pitch from any position.
 Failing to pitch to the batter in a continuous motion immediately after any movement of any part of the body such as he habitually uses in his delivery
 Taking a hand off the ball while in a set position (unless he pitches to the batter or throws toward a base or he steps toward and feints a throw to second or third base)
 Failing to pitch to the batter when the entire non-pivot foot passes behind the perpendicular plane of the back edge of the pitcher’s plate, except when feinting or throwing to second base in an attempt to put out a runner
 The pitcher makes a movement naturally associated with pitching and/or places his feet on the pitcher's plate without the ball.  

The pitcher's acts of spitting on the ball, defacing or altering the ball, rubbing the ball on the clothing or body, or applying a foreign substance to the ball are not balks; however, it will result in the pitcher's ejection from the game if caught.

Clarifications
A pitcher was allowed to feint toward third (or second) base, and then turn and throw or feint to first base if the pitcher's pivot foot disengaged the rubber after the initial feint.  This is called the "fake to third, throw to first" play. However, Major League Baseball classified this as a balk beginning with the 2013 season.

If no runners are on base and the pitcher commits an otherwise balkable action, there generally is no penalty. However, delivering a quick return or pitching while off the rubber (which constitute balks when runners are on base) results in a ball being called with the bases empty. If the pitcher commits an act confusing to the batter with nobody on, stops their delivery, or otherwise violates, play is restarted without penalty and time is called. If a pitcher repeatedly commits illegal actions without runners on base, they may be subject to ejection for persistently violating the rules.

If, during an attempt to execute the "hidden ball trick" (where the defensive team deceives the runner(s) as to the ball's location while the play is live), the pitcher stands on the rubber prior to the fielder revealing the ball and applying the tag, the runner is not out.  Instead, it is a balk, with all runners on base being awarded their next base.

Common misconceptions
"Catcher's balk" is not a term in the official rules, but is sometimes used to describe an atypical situation relating to an intentional walk: if the catcher is not completely within the catcher's box when the pitcher releases the ball during delivery, it is a violation. The balk is still charged to the pitcher, because such a pitch is defined as a "Pitcher Illegal Action."

A pitcher is not required to step off the rubber before throwing to an occupied base in a pick-off attempt. With one foot on the rubber in either the windup position or the "set" position, the pitcher may either: 1) deliver the ball to the batter: 2) throw to a base for a pickoff; or 3) step off the rubber.

MLB rules state that: "Pitchers shall take signs from the catcher while in contact with the pitcher’s plate" (the rubber), but the rules do not describe the infraction as a balk.

Major League Baseball balk records
Steve Carlton had 90 balks during his major league career.

The major league record in a single season is held by Dave Stewart, who had 16 balks in 1988 while pitching for the Oakland Athletics.

The major league record for the most balks in one game is held by Bob Shaw, who had five balks in a May 4, 1963, game while pitching for the Milwaukee Braves against the Chicago Cubs.  Four of the five balks came when the Cubs' Billy Williams was on base: one in the first inning, then three more in the third inning. In the latter frame, Shaw walked Williams, and then proceeded to balk him to second, third and home.  Shaw's balks were blamed on his difficulty adjusting to a then-new point of emphasis in the rules: umpires were told to strictly enforce the section of the balk rule that required the pitcher, when going from the stretch to the set position, to come to a complete stop with his hands together for one full second before pitching.  The rule had been virtually ignored before.

Knuckleballer Charlie Hough was once called for nine balks in a single major league exhibition game, occurring in March 1988. Hough was called for seven balks in a single inning of the game, as umpires set out to "enforce a full set position" for the coming season.

On September 27, 2022, Miami Marlins reliever Richard Bleier was called for three balks in a row by first-base umpire John Tumpane, all while facing New York Mets batter Pete Alonso. Bleier had given up a single, and was then called for three balks while facing Alonso, balking the runner home. Marlins Manager Don Mattingly was ejected for arguing the third balk. After Alonso grounded out for the third out of the inning, Bleier was also ejected for continuing to argue the balks. Until that point, Bleier had never had a balk called against him in his seven-year major league career, over the course of 303 games. This instance tied the record for most balks in an inning and for most balks in a single at bat. CBS Sports opined: "Some balks are obvious. Those are not... You almost have to be looking for a reason to call a balk to ring Bleier up on that motion three -- again, three! -- times in a single inning."

Notable balks

During the 1947 World Series (New York Yankees vs. Brooklyn Dodgers) Spec Shea dropped the ball trying to pick off Jackie Robinson at first base; after at least one other attempt, he dropped the ball and umpire Babe Pinelli waved Robinson to second base.

A famous balk came in the first All-Star Game of 1961, when strong winds at Candlestick Park caused pitcher Stu Miller to sway erratically and be called for a balk. This story is often exaggerated in re-tellings of baseball lore, some having Miller being blown off the pitching mound.

The Los Angeles Dodgers defeated the Texas Rangers on June 18, 2015, when Rangers relief pitcher Keone Kela committed a balk in the bottom of the ninth inning of a tie game with Dodger Enrique Hernández at third base. There have been at least 23 such walk-off balks (or "balk-offs") in major league history since 1914.

On June 14, 2019, Dodgers closer Kenley Jansen intentionally balked during a game with the Chicago Cubs. With the Dodgers leading, 5–3, and two outs in the top of the ninth inning, the Cubs' Jason Heyward was on second base. Concerned that a runner at second base could possibly steal signs, Jansen intentionally balked, advancing the runner to third base. Jansen then struck out batter Víctor Caratini for the final out of the game. Other intentional balks, while rare, have subsequently occurred in MLB.

References

External links

 What  a balk? on MLB Network via YouTube
 Balk demonstrations by Dan Blewett
 What is a Balk by Jack Perconte

Baseball rules
Baseball pitching
Pitching statistics